Johannes (Hannes) Valkama (18 December 1876, Laukaa - 19 November 1952) was a Finnish Lutheran clergyman and politician. He was a member of the Parliament of Finland from 1924 to 1927, representing the National Progressive Party.

References

1876 births
1952 deaths
People from Laukaa
People from Vaasa Province (Grand Duchy of Finland)
20th-century Finnish Lutheran clergy
National Progressive Party (Finland) politicians
Members of the Parliament of Finland (1924–27)
University of Helsinki alumni